Basilan State College (BasSC) is a public higher education institution in the island province of Basilan, Philippines. Its main campus is located in Isabela City with satellite campuses in Lamitan, Maluso and Tipo-Tipo, Basilan and an  agricultural campus in Santa Clara. The current college president is Dr. Haipa A. Salain.

In 2021, Republic Act No. 115544 was signed into law, providing for the conversion of Basilan State College into a state university.

References

External links
 

Basilan State College
Mindanao Association State Colleges and Universities Foundation
Universities and colleges in Basilan
Isabela, Basilan
Philippine Association of State Universities and Colleges